Martin Howy Irving (21 February 1831 – 23 January 1912) was an English rower and educationist who spent nearly all his career in Australia .

Background and early career
Irving was born in St Pancras, London, the son of Edward Irving, a major figure of the Catholic Apostolic Church, whom Carlyle called the "freest, brotherliest, bravest human soul mine ever came in contact with", and his wife Isabella Martin. Irving was educated at King's College School, and Balliol College, Oxford, where he graduated B.A. in 1853 and M.A. in 1856, with first class honours in classics and second class honours in mathematics. At Oxford he was an active rower and won the college and university sculls in 1852. In the same year, he was runner up in the Silver Goblets paired with Walter Francis Short and losing to Philip Nind and Henry Raine Barker in the final. He was also runner-up in the Diamond Challenge Sculls to Stephen Rippingall in 1853.

Academic career
Irving taught classics as second master at the City of London School from 1854 to 1856. He was then was appointed professor of classics and English at the University of Melbourne, where he arrived in July 1856 and held this position for nearly 15 years. Irving took much interest in the development of the young university, but in January 1871 he resigned to become headmaster of Wesley College, Melbourne. He had been offered a salary much larger than he had been receiving as a professor, and this no doubt influenced his decision as he had a growing family. But there was another factor. In the early years of the university students were few, many of them had not been properly prepared for university work, and probably Irving felt he would be doing a real service by helping to raise the standard of secondary school education. At Wesley he was a great success, and by the end of 1874 the number of pupils had risen to 271, a record not exceeded until about 30 years later. He appealed to what was best in the boys' natures, and his relations with his masters were as happy as those with the boys. Samuel Alexander who was a pupil in his period has testified to the excellence and breadth of the education he received at this school.  At the end of five years at Wesley, Irving decided that he would prefer the control of a school untrammelled by any committee or council. He bought the Hawthorn Grammar School and made it one of the most successful private schools in Melbourne, with a roll of 200 boys, 50 of whom were boarders.

In 1884 Irving handed over the school to his son, Edward H. Irving, and became a member of the public service board of Victoria for a period of 10 years. Irving had retained his interest in the University of Melbourne after giving up his professorship, was a member of the council for some years, and at the election for chancellor in 1886 was defeated by one vote, Sir Anthony Colling Brownless receiving six votes to his five. In 1887 became vice-chancellor of the University of Melbourne and held the position until 1889. In earlier years he had been much interested in the volunteer movement and the militia, in which he attained the rank of lieutenant-colonel. He retired from the public service board in 1894 with a pension, and in 1900 returned to England and devoted himself to the affairs of the Catholic Apostolic Church, of which he had always been an adherent. He received the honorary Doctor of Laws (LL.D) from the University of Glasgow in June 1901.

Personal
Irving, who was well over six feet high, and an excellent oarsman and rifle shot, was the founder of amateur rowing in Victoria. He was a man of fine character with a good sense of business, and was a strong influence in the development of both secondary and university education in Victoria.

Irving was twice married. His first marriage in 1855 was to Caroline Mary Bruyeres, daughter of Captain Bruyeres and they had four sons and two daughters. His second wife was Mary Mowat, daughter of John Mowat of Dublin, and they had one son and seven daughters. Two of his daughters carried on the tradition for many years as principals of Lauriston Girls' School, Melbourne. One of his sons, Godfrey George Howy Irving (1867–11 December 1937), joined the Australian permanent military forces and led the Australian Commonwealth Horse in the South African War. He was chief of the Australian general staff in 1913, and in command of the 14th infantry brigade in Egypt in 1916. After his return to Australia he was promoted major-general and was deputy quartermaster-general until his retirement in 1922.

Irving visited Victoria for a few weeks in 1906, and returning to England died at Albury near Guildford in 1912, at the age of 80.

References

G. C. Fendley, 'Irving, Martin Howy (1831–1912)', Australian Dictionary of Biography, Volume 4, MUP, 1972, pp 462–464. Retrieved 2013-11-17
The Argus, Melbourne, 25 January 1912;
The Times, 24 January 1912;
The History of Wesley College, 1865–1919;
Sir Ernest Scott, A History of the University of Melbourne;
The Argus, 13 December 1937;
C. E. W. Bean, Official History of the War of 1914–1918;
John Lang, The Victorian Oarsman.

Further reading
 John Martin, Martin Howy Irving: Professor, Headmaster, Public Servant. Working Paper No. 10, The History of the University Unit, The University of Melbourne. 2006.

1831 births
1912 deaths
Rowers from Greater London
Australian headmasters
People educated at King's College School, London
Alumni of Balliol College, Oxford
Vice-Chancellors of the University of Melbourne
Schoolteachers from London
People from St Pancras, London
English emigrants to colonial Australia
Wesley College (Victoria)